The World Professional Championships may refer to:

 World Professional Figure Skating Championships
 World Professional Championships, the 1954–1962 name of the U.S. Pro Tennis Championships